Alula Girma (born 15 July 1993) is an Ethiopian footballer. He currently plays for Saint-George SA.

Career

Alula is right back defender and is part of the Ethiopia national football team. The Saint-George player's displays have attracted rave reviews and interest from clubs in Egypt and Tunisia. Alula is a product of Saint-George youth system. His first appearance for the first team came in the 2008 Super cup match against Ethiopia Bunna, a game that Kidus Giorgis won 4–2. He was given more opportunities with the first team, on the right back side. He went on to make most appearances for the first team that season as Kidus Giorgis finished safely in 1st place. Alula is now an important first team member, and putting in some brilliant performances.

International career

Alula debuted for Ethiopia in 2010. He is on the final list of players called for 2013 African Nations Cup.

References

External links
 
 

1993 births
Living people
Ethiopian footballers
Ethiopia international footballers
2013 Africa Cup of Nations players
2014 African Nations Championship players
Ethiopia A' international footballers
Saint George S.C. players
Association football fullbacks
2016 African Nations Championship players